Parada is a genus of lace bugs in the family Tingidae. There are about seven described species in Parada.

Species
 Parada absona Drake, 1952
 Parada darlingtoni Drake, 1952
 Parada hackeri Drake, 1952
 Parada popla Drake, 1942
 Parada solla Drake & Ruhoff, 1961
 Parada taeniophora (Horváth, 1925)
 Parada torta Drake, 1942

References

Further reading

 
 
 
 
 

Tingidae
Cimicomorpha genera